Miguel Pérez Villar (6 September 1945 – 20 July 2022) was a Spanish businessman and politician. He served as a member of the Senate of Spain from 1991 to 1993. Villar died in July 2022 in Madrid, at the age of 76.

References 

1945 births
2022 deaths
People from Zamora, Spain
Members of the Senate of Spain
People's Party (Spain) politicians
Spanish businesspeople
20th-century Spanish politicians